Japan participated and hosted the 1958 Asian Games held in the capital city of Tokyo.
This country was ranked 1st with 67 gold medals, 41 silver medals and 30 bronze medals with a total of 138 medals
to secure its top spot in the medal tally.

References

Nations at the 1958 Asian Games
1958
Asian Games